The Angolan Navy or MGA is the naval branch of the Angolan Armed Forces and is tasked with protecting Angola's 1,600 km long coastline. The Angolan Navy has approximately 1,000 personnel.

History 
The Angolan Navy was officially founded on 10 July 1976, though it traces its origins to 11 November 1975 when Angolans took over naval facilities abandoned by the Portuguese Navy. Angolan Navy forces participated in the Angolan Civil War from 1975 until 2002. United States Navy Vice Admiral Harry B. Harris Jr., then commander of the US 6th Fleet, visited Luanda during the 35th anniversary of the MGA on July 9, 2012.

Modernization 
Angola's oil wealth is allowing it to modernize its naval forces as most of the existing fleet are Soviet Navy exports from the 1980s. It was reported in 2009 that Angola was hoping to sign a US$800m deal with Germany for 3 new border protection Fast Attack Craft, probably Lurssen PV80's. They were still trying to complete the deal in 2011 and there has been no word on it since.

In December 2013 it was reported that Angola would be buying a package of old ships from the Spanish Navy. Príncipe de Asturias (R11) a small (16,000t) Harrier carrier, to be transferred along with Pizarro (L42) a Newport class landing ship, Diana (F32) a Descubierta class corvette converted to minesweeper support ship, Chilreu (P61) lead ship of its class of ocean patrol vessels, and Ízaro (P27) an Anaga class patrol ship.

Structure 
Naval War Institute (INSG)
Naval Academy
Naval Specialist School
3 Coastal Surveillance Companies (CRTOC)
1 Naval Infantry Unit - 1 Light Amphibious Battalion (4 Marine Companies, 1 Naval Police Unit, 1 Amphibious Operations Unit)
Special Forces, heavy weapons, snipers, boarding units, and an armored section.

Equipment

Surface Vessels

Corvette 
A corvette is a small warship. It is traditionally the smallest class of vessel considered to be a proper (or "rated") warship. The warship class above the corvette is the frigate.

Fast Missile Craft 
Small ships or boats designed to fire anti-ship missiles. First used by the Soviet Union, missile-armed FAC's could be used to sink much larger enemy naval ships.

Fast Torpedo Craft 
Small ships or boats designed to fire torpedoes. First used in the Second World War by both the Royal Navy and the Kriegsmarine, FAC's could be used to sink much larger enemy naval ships.

Inland/Coastal Patrol Boats 
Small border protection craft often used for anti-piracy, anti-smuggling, and border patrolling. May be designed for use on estuaries and rivers (brown water) or oceanic (blue water) environments.

On 5 September 2014, the Angolan Minister of Defence João Manuel Lourenço and Brazil's Minister of Defence Celso Amorim signed a Memorandum of Understanding as part of Angola's Naval Power Development Program (PRONAVAL). The MOU  specifies that Angola will acquire seven Macaé-class patrol vessel, four to be built in Brazil, and three in Angola. The Brazilian EMGEPRON will have the lead in the project, overseeing the Angolan shipyard and training in addition to overall project management.

Mine Warfare Craft 
Small ship designed for either clearing up minefields or deploying new minefields.

Amphibious Vessels 

Ship designed to deploy troops on coasts and beaches during amphibious assault operations.

Coastal Defense Equipment 
Defensive equipment, both active and passive, used to defend Angola's coasts.
SS-C1 Sepal Radar System.

Maritime Patrol Aircraft 
Aircraft designed for maritime patrols, often involving anti-ship, anti-submarine, and search and rescue duties.

References 

 
Military of Angola
Military history of Angola
Navies by country
1977 establishments in Angola
Military units and formations established in 1977